Julia Cooper Mack (née Perry; July 17, 1920January 17, 2014) was a judge of the District of Columbia Court of Appeals.  She was appointed to this position in 1975.  She was the first African-American woman ever appointed to a court of last resort in the United States.

She was born to Dallas Leary Perry, Jr. and Emily (McCoy) Perry.

She earned her bachelor's degree in mathematics from Hampton University and her law degree from Howard University. One of her first law clerks was Allyson Kay Duncan, who went on to become the first African-American woman appointed to the United States Court of Appeals for the Fourth Circuit.

See also
List of first women lawyers and judges in Washington D.C. (Federal District)

References

Sources
Speaking Truth to Power: The Jurisprudence of Julia Cooper Mack, 40 Howard L.J. 291 (1996-1997)

Inez Smith Reid, Historical Links: The Remarkable Legacy and Legal Journey of the Honorable Julia Cooper Mack, 8 U.D.C. L. Rev. 303 (2004)

African-American judges
Howard University School of Law alumni
Hampton University alumni
Judges of the District of Columbia Court of Appeals
1920 births
2014 deaths
20th-century American judges
20th-century American women judges
20th-century American lawyers
20th-century African-American women
20th-century African-American people
21st-century African-American people
21st-century African-American women
21st-century American women judges
21st-century American judges